Samuel Shapiro (born August 26, 1927) is a Maine politician. A Democrat, Shapiro served from 1981 to 1996 as State Treasurer of Maine.

Shapiro was born in Brownsville, Pennsylvania to immigrant parents from Ukraine and Lithuania. He spent two years in the U.S. Navy and then attended the University of Pittsburgh on the G.I. bill. He then moved to Waterville, Maine, where he ran several furniture stores owned by his father-in-law. Shapiro eventually became the treasurer of the Maine Democratic Party for thirteen years. He served as state treasurer of Maine from 1981 to 1996.

References

1927 births
Jewish American people in Maine politics
Possibly living people
People from Waterville, Maine
People from Brownsville, Pennsylvania
Maine Democrats
University of Pittsburgh alumni
State treasurers of Maine
2004 United States presidential electors
2008 United States presidential electors
2016 United States presidential electors
21st-century American Jews